The 1933 Kansas Jayhawks football team represented the University of Kansas in the Big Six Conference during the 1933 college football season. In their second season under head coach Adrian Lindsey, the Jayhawks compiled a 5–4–1 record (2–3 against conference opponents), finished in fourth place in the conference, and outscored opponents by a combined total of 102 to 51. They played their home games at Memorial Stadium in Lawrence, Kansas. Ormand Beach was the team captain.

Three Kansas players were selected by the Associated Press as second-team players on the 1933 All-Big Six Conference football team: fullback Ormand Beach, end Ernest Casini, and tackle Peter Mehringer.

Schedule

References

Kansas
Kansas Jayhawks football seasons
Kansas Jayhawks football